The Sandugo Festival is an annual historical celebration that takes place every year in Tagbilaran City on the island of Bohol in the Philippines. This festival commemorates the Treaty of Friendship between Datu Sikatuna, a chieftain in Bohol, and Spanish conquistador Miguel López de Legazpi. This 16th-century peace treaty occurred on March 16, 1565 through a blood compact or "sandugo".

The Sandugo Festival is held every July. The Tagbilaran City Charter Day on July 1 kicks-off the month-long festival with a holy mass, diana, motorcade and program sponsored by the City Government of Tagbilaran. Among the major activities during the month is the Miss Bohol Sandugo Beauty Pageant, and the Sandugo Street Dancing Competition which is usually held on the 3rd or 4th Sunday of July, and organized by the Bohol Sandugo Foundation, Inc. (BSFI).

The Sandugo Street Dancing

In 2010, the Street Dancing Competition will be held on July 25. The competition is usually participated in by schools, the city and municipal governments, boholano organizations abroad, and even contingents from other provinces. The competition starts at noon at the City Pier, passes through the city's major streets, and culminates at the Pres. Carlos P. Garcia Sports Complex where a Sandugo Re-enactment is held. The final judging of the competition will be held at the Complex where the participants will again perform for the audience. The winners receive thousands of pesos in prizes.

Aside from the activities organized by the city and provincial governments and by the BSFI, are other activities sponsored by various private sectors like nightly shows and trade/food fair at the City Pier, product showcase, concerts, medical and surgical missions, and others.

Street Dancing Champions

NOTE: There were no competitions from 2005-2007. In 2005 and 2006, Champions from around the country like Masskara, Ati-atihan, etc., performed. In 2007, 30 local contingents participated in an exhibition performance.
[1] now called Dr. Cecilio Putong National High School (DCPNHS)
[2] Sandugo Street Dancing Hall of Fame Awardee
[3] now called Bohol Island State University (BISU), formerly Central Visayas State College of Agriculture, Forestry & Technology (CVSCAFT)

The Bohol Sandugo Foundation, Inc.

Due to the inadequate support coming from both government and private sectors coupled with the dwindling public interest in the yearly celebration of the Sandugo Festival, the Bohol Sandugo Foundation, Inc. (BSFI) was organized in 1991. Since then, the BSFI has ably spearheaded the celebration of the Sandugo and has made significant efforts in reviving a nationwide interest in the event which has now become a magnetic byword in the tourism industry.

Tigum Bol-anon Sa Tibuok Kalibutan

Every two years, the "Tigum Bol-anon Sa Tibuok Kalibutan" (English: A Gathering of Boholanos Around the World) or TBTK is held in unison with the Sandugo Festival. This gathering is organized by the Confederation of Boholanos in the US and Canada or CONBUSAC, which aims to gather Boholanos from all over for a celebration of unity. Among the activities conducted by the TBTK is the Search for Mrs. Bohol International and Miss Bohol International, CONBUSAC Convention, Awarding of Outstanding Boholanos, medical and surgical missions (in cooperation with the BSFI), and others.

The 2010 Sandugo Festival

The 2010 theme is "Sandugo at 22: Onward for Unity and Progress". The schedule of events are as follows:
 July 1 – Tagbilaran City's 44th Charter Anniversary at the City Hall Atrium
 July 1–31 - Trade/Food Fair at the City Pier
 July 16 - Miss Bohol Sandugo Pageant & Coronation Night at the Bohol Cultural Center
 July 21–25 - DTI Sandugo Product Showcase at the Block, Island City Mall
 July 22 - 156th Bohol Day Celebration at the Bohol Cultural Center
 July 25 - Sandugo Street Dancing, City Pier to CPG Sports Complex

References

External links 

 Bohol Sandugo Festival website
  The Official website of the City Government of Tagbilaran
 The Official Website of the Provincial Government of Bohol
 Sandugo Photos
 Bohol Festival
 Sandugo Festival

Culture of Bohol
Tagbilaran
Cebuano culture
Visayan festivals
Festivals in the Philippines
Tourist attractions in Bohol